Acacia cupularis, commonly known as the Coastal Umbrella Bush, is a shrub belonging to the genus Acacia and the subgenus Phyllodineae that is endemic to southern parts of Australia.

Description
The lightly pruinose branchlets are often a dark red-brown in colour. It blooms from July to December and produces yellow flowers. The spherical flower-heads contain 16 to 22 golden flowers. The seeds within the pods are a dull light brown colour and have an oblong shape with an orange to red aril.

Taxonomy
The species was first formally described by the botanist Karel Domin in 1923 as part of the work New Additions to the Flora of Western Australia as published in the work Vestnik Kralovske Ceske Spolecnosti Nauk, Trida Matematiko-Prirodevedecke. Synonyms include; Acacia ligulata var. minor, Racosperma ligulatum var. minus and Acacia bivenosa subsp. wayi. It is also often confused with Acacia salicina. 
It is a part of the Acacia bivenosa group of wattles and is similar in appearance to Acacia maxwellii, Acacia crassiuscula and Acacia anceps x nematophylla.

Distribution
It is native to an area mostly along the coast in South Australia, western Victoria and the Goldfields-Esperance, Great Southern, South West and Wheatbelt regions of Western Australia. It is often situated on sand plains, along drainage lines and in and around clay pans growing in sandy-clay soils often around limestone and as a part of mallee communities.

See also
List of Acacia species

References

cupularis
Acacias of Western Australia
Flora of South Australia
Plants described in 1923
Taxa named by Karel Domin
Flora of Victoria (Australia)